Additive may refer to:

Mathematics
 Additive function, a function in number theory
 Additive map, a function that preserves the addition operation
 Additive set-functionn see Sigma additivity
 Additive category, a preadditive category with finite biproducts
 Additive inverse, an arithmetic concept

Science
 Additive color, as opposed to subtractive color
 Additive model, a statistical regression model
 Additive synthesis, an audio synthesis technique
 Additive genetic effects 
 Additive quantity, a physical quantity that is additive for subsystems; see Intensive and extensive properties

Engineering
 Feed additive
 Gasoline additive, a substance used to improve the performance of a fuel, lower emissions or clean the engine
 Oil additive, a substance used to improve the performance of a lubricant
 Weakly additive, the quality of preferences in some logistics problems
 Polymer additive
 Pit additive, a material aiming to reduce fecal sludge build-up and control odor in pit latrines, septic tanks and wastewater treatment plants
 Biodegradable additives

Other uses
 , one of the grammatical cases in Estonian
 Food additive, any substance added to food to improve flavor, appearance, shelf life, etc.
 Additive rhythm, a larger period of time constructed from smaller ones